Kenneth Jerry Adair (December 17, 1936 – May 31, 1987) was an American Major League Baseball second baseman, shortstop and third baseman with the Baltimore Orioles, Chicago White Sox, Boston Red Sox and the Kansas City Royals between 1958 and 1970. Adair spent one season in Japan playing for the Hankyu Braves / Orix BlueWave.

Early life
Adair was born in Sand Springs, Oklahoma, and graduated from Charles Page High School. He played college baseball and basketball (under Hank Iba) at Oklahoma State University. Adair also played one year in a work/play program for the McPherson (Kansas) BJs in the Ban Johnson League. That year McPherson went to the National Ban Johnson League tournament finals played in Wichita. He pitched many games as well as playing the infield.

Baltimore Orioles
Adair was signed by the Baltimore Orioles out of Oklahoma State University on September 2, 1958 for a $40,000 bonus. He made his Major League Baseball debut with the club that day against the Washington Senators, coming into the game in the bottom of the 8th inning as a defensive replacement for shortstop Chuck Oertel. He did not get an at bat in the game. Adair's first big league at bat came on September 5 against the Boston Red Sox. After drawing a walk and scoring in the 8th inning, Adair reached base again in the ninth inning on a fielder's choice. He picked up his first big league hit (a single to left field) in a 3–2 Orioles win over the visiting New York Yankees on September 21. That season, he hit .105 (2-for-19) in 11 games with the Orioles, primarily playing shortstop.

He hit .314 (11-for-35) in 12 games in 1959 and went 1-for-5 (.200) in 3 games in 1960.

Adair's first full season in the big leagues came in 1961 with the Orioles, hitting .264 with 9 home runs and 37 RBI in 133 games. Although the majority of his time was spent at second base, he also played some shortstop and third base that year.

Once, during the 1964 season, he was struck in the mouth by a bad throw during the first game of a doubleheader with the Detroit Tigers. The resulting laceration required 11 stitches, but Adair was back in the park in uniform in time to play the entire second game.

In 1965, 28-year-old Adair hit .259 with 7 home runs and a career-high 66 RBI in 157 games with the Orioles. He was among American League leaders with 157 games (8th in the AL), 582 at bats (10th in the AL), 26 doubles (7th in the AL), 115 singles (10th in the AL) and 6 sacrifice flies (8th in the AL). As a result, Adair finished 17th in the AL MVP vote that was won by Zoilo Versalles of the Minnesota Twins.

Chicago White Sox
On June 13, 1966, Adair was traded by the Orioles with minor leaguer John Riddle to the Chicago White Sox for Eddie Fisher.

Boston Red Sox
On June 2, 1967, Adair was traded by the White Sox to the Boston Red Sox for Don McMahon and minor leaguer Rob Snow. Adair played well down the stretch with the Red Sox, hitting .291 with 3 homers and 26 RBI in 89 games, rounding out his season stats to .271 with 3 HR and 35 RBI in 117 games. With his pennant push performance at the plate, coupled with stellar defensive play, Adair finished 15th in the AL MVP balloting. Teammate Carl Yastrzemski won the award that year after claiming the elusive triple crown.

Kansas City Royals
Adair was taken by the Kansas City Royals with the 51st pick of the 1968 MLB expansion draft. In the Royals' inaugural season of 1969, the 32-year-old Adair hit .250 with 5 home runs and 48 RBI in 126 games.

In 1970, Adair hit just .148 (4-for-27) before being abruptly released on May 5 as he was about to board a plane to make a road trip to Baltimore with the team. Adair had spent much of spring training that year with his six-year-old daughter, Tammy, who had terminal cancer and eventually died and claimed the Royals let him go without taking the family's problems into consideration. Royals General Manager Cedric Tallis defended the team's decision to release Adair saying "We just felt he couldn't help the club".

Legacy
While having only a .254 career batting average, he was considered a good clutch hitter (Carl Yastrzemski wrote in his autobiography Baseball, The Wall, and Me "That man was one of the coolest clutch hitters I had seen").  However, his greatest strength was his defensive ability.  Adair set then-major league records for single-season fielding percentage (.994) and fewest errors (5) in 1964, and followed that up by leading the league in fielding percentage again in 1965. He also set a record for consecutive errorless games by a second baseman (89), and consecutive chances handled without an error (458) from July 22, 1964 through May 6, 1965.  In addition, he was considered a "gamer" who would often play when injured.

After leaving Major League Baseball, Adair played in Japan for a year, and later coached for the Oakland Athletics (1972–74) and the California Angels (1975), working under his former Oriole teammate and manager in Boston Dick Williams.

Adair died of liver cancer on May 31, 1987 in Tulsa, Oklahoma, at the age of 50.

References

External links

1936 births
1987 deaths
Amarillo Gold Sox players
American expatriate baseball players in Japan
American men's basketball players
Baltimore Orioles players
Baseball players from Oklahoma
Boston Red Sox players
California Angels coaches
Chicago White Sox players
Deaths from cancer in Oklahoma
Deaths from liver cancer
Hankyu Braves players
Kansas City Royals players
Major League Baseball first base coaches
Major League Baseball second basemen
Miami Marlins (IL) players
Oakland Athletics coaches
Oklahoma State Cowboys basketball players
People from Sand Springs, Oklahoma
Tulsa Oilers (baseball) players
Williston Oilers players
Oklahoma State Cowboys baseball players